Snowdenia is a genus of plants in the grass family, they are native to Arabia and East Africa.

The genus was circumscribed by Charles Edward Hubbard in Bull. Misc. Inform. Kew (1929) on page 30 in 1929.

The genus name of Snowdenia is in honour of Joseph Devenport Snowden (1886–1973), who was a British gardener, botanist and mycologist. Who worked at Kew Gardens.

Species
As accepted by Kew;
 Snowdenia microcarpha C.E.Hubb. - Uganda
 Snowdenia mutica (Hochst.) Pilg. - Ethiopia
 Snowdenia petitiana (A.Rich.) C.E.Hubb. - Ethiopia, Kenya, Tanzania, Uganda, Yemen
 Snowdenia polystachya (Fresen.) Pilg. - Ethiopia, Eritrea, Sudan, Kenya, Tanzania, Uganda, Yemen, Saudi Arabia

References

Panicoideae
Poaceae genera
Grasses of Africa
Grasses of Asia
Afromontane flora
Taxa named by Charles Edward Hubbard